This is a list of the main career statistics of tennis player Conchita Martínez.

Significant finals

Grand Slam finals

Singles: 3 (1 title, 2 runner-ups)

Doubles: 2 (runner-ups)

Olympics

Doubles: 3 (2 silver medals, 1 bronze medal)

Tier I

Singles: 14 (9 titles, 5 runner-ups)

WTA Tour finals

Singles: 55 (33 titles, 22 runner-ups)

Doubles: 39 (13 titles, 26 runner-ups)

ITF finals

Singles: 5 (4–1)

Doubles: 2 (2–0)

Other finals

Mediterranean games

Singles: 1 (1 gold medal)

Spanish Championship

Singles: 1 (1-0)

Spanish Masters

Singles: 2 (1-1)

Performance timelines

Singles

Doubles

WTA Tour career earnings

Head-to-head vs. top 10 ranked players

Martínez, Conchita